Richards, McCarty & Bulford was an American architectural firm.  The General Services Administration has called the firm the "preeminent" architectural firm of the city of Columbus, Ohio.  A number of the firm's works are listed on the National Register of Historic Places.

History 
Clarence Earl Richards (1864–1921) and Joel Edward McCarty (1856–1952) founded the firm as Richards & McCarty in 1898, Columbus, Ohio. George Henry Bulford (1870–1942) joined as partner in 1899 and the firm name became Richards, McCarty & Bulford.  Richards, McCarty, and Bulford had previously apprenticed at the firm of Yost & Packard of Columbus. By way of McCarty's mother, Mary McCarty (née Mary Yost; 1834–1893), McCarty was a nephew of Joseph W. Yost.

The firm was in business until 1943.

Works

Tennessee 
 The Burwell, 602 S. Gay St., Knoxville, Tennessee, NRHP-listed

Indiana 
 Anderson Center for the Arts, 32 W. 10th St., Anderson, Indiana, NRHP-listed
 Grant County Jail and Sheriff's Residence, 215 E. 3rd St., Marion, Indiana, NRHP-listed
 Part of the Marion Downtown Commercial Historic District, Marion, Indiana, NRHP-listed

Ohio

Columbus 
 American Education Press Building, 400 S. Front St.
 Athletic Club of Columbus, 136 East Broad St.
 Central Union Telephone Building, 33 N. Third St.
 Citizens Building, 51 N. High St., NRHP-listed
 Columbus Museum of Art, 480 E. Broad St., NRHP-listed
 Frederick A. Miller House, 2065 Barton Pl. & 140 Park Dr., NRHP-listed
 Hartman Building and Theater, State and Third streets
 Johnson-Campbell House, 1203 E. Broad St., NRHP-listed
 Joseph P. Kinneary United States Courthouse, 85 Marconi Blvd.
 Knights of Columbus Building
 Lazarus Building, 141 S. High St.
 Ohio Institution for the Education of the Deaf and Dumb, 408 E. Town St., NRHP-listed
 Ohio National Bank, 167 S. High St., NRHP-listed
 South High School, 1160 Ann St.
 St. Joseph Cathedral alterations
 White-Haines Building, 82 N. High St.

Elsewhere in Ohio 
 Eldridge-Higgins Building, 525 Orange St., Coshocton, Ohio, NRHP-listed
 Hardin County Courthouse, Courthouse Sq., Kenton, Ohio, NRHP-listed
 Kenton Public Library, 121 N. Detroit Street, Kenton, Ohio
 Lawrence County Courthouse (Ironton, Ohio) NRHP-listed
 Marting Hotel, 202 Park Av., Ironton, Ohio, NRHP-listed
 Frank Huber Residence, 416 East Church Street and Greenwood Street, Marion, Ohio.

Kentucky 
 Eleventh District School, Parkway and Altamont St., Covington, Kentucky, NRHP-listed
 Lexington City National Bank Building, 259-265 W. Main St., Lexington, Kentucky, NRHP-listed

Kansas

Wichita 
 The Schweiter Building – at Main Street and Doublas Avenue, complete around 1910, Henry S. Schweiter Jr. (1876–1948), proprietor
 The Wichita Forum, completed 1911, was, at the time, the largest convention facility in Kansas. The financing was sponsored by the city of Wichita
 The Hotel Lassen (aka Market Centre), built in 1918, Henry Lassen (1861–1919), proprietor (NRHP Information System #84000108, October 4, 1984)
 The Wheeler-Kelly-Hagney building – 120 South Market Street, was built in 1920.  The founding officers of Wheeler, Kelly, Hagney Trust Company were Howard Victor Wheeler (1874–1951), Harry Johnston Hagney (1865–1931), John Clark Kelly (1872–1956), and Henry Harrison Dewey (1841–1916) – all members of a real estate firm (NRHP Information System ID: #82002671, March 11, 1982)
 Wesley Hospital, dedicated September 19, 1921
 The First National Bank Building, at 105 North Main Street, opened in 1921 (northwest corner of Main Street and Douglas Avenue), caddy corner to the Beacon building; George H. Bulford was the architect.

Selected architects 
The three firm name-sake architects all had worked at Yost & Packard in Columbus:
 C.E. Richards (né Clarence Earl Richards; 1864–1921), charter member of the Columbus, Ohio, chapter of the American Institute of Architects
 J.E. McCarty (né Joel Edward McCarty; 1856–1952)
 George Henry Bulford (1870–1942)

See also
 Architecture of Columbus, Ohio

References

External links
Richards, McCarty & Bulford collection, at Ohio State University KSA

Architecture firms based in Ohio
Companies based in the Columbus, Ohio metropolitan area
1898 establishments in Ohio